The tenth season of the Pakistani music television series Coke Studio premiered on 11 August 2017, and ended on 21 September 2017. Strings and The Coca-Cola Company emceed the show as executive producers, while the show returned with the previous year's format of music directors leading and producing their own songs under Strings' supervision, despite the decision of not adopting this format for next year.

The season featured 7 episodes, each having 4 tracks, plus one promo and one full song (hence two season openers); making it a total of 32 songs. It turned out to be the Strings' last Coke Studio production.

Artists

Featured artists 

Ali Sethi
Aima Baig
Danyal Zafar
Rahat Fateh Ali Khan
Abrar-ul-Haq
Ali Zafar
Ayesha Omar
Atif Aslam
Bohemia
Bilal Saeed
Meesha Shafi
Mehwish Hayat
Jabar Abbas
Momina Mustehsan
Waqar Ehsin
Attaullah Khan Esakhelvi
Sanwal Khan Esakhelvi
Qurat-ul-Ain Balouch
Sahir Ali Bagga
Asim Azhar
Uzair Jaswal
Hina Nasrullah
Ali Hamza
Nabeel Shaukat Ali
Faraz Anwar
Faiza Mujahid
Ahmed Jahanzeb
Zaw Ali
Sajjad Ali
Waqar Ali
Jawad Ahmed
Shiraz Uppal
Nirmal Roy
Umair Jaswal
Farhan Saeed
Akbar Ali
Rachel Viccaji
Shuja Haider
Jaffer Zaidi
Humaira Channa
Mekaal Hasan
Salman Ahmad
Shani Arshad
Arieb Azhar
Ali Noor
Irteassh
Humera Arshad
Kaavish
Amanat Ali
Natasha Khan
Javed Bashir
Shafqat Amanat Ali Khan
Strings

Music directors
Shuja Haider, Shani Arshad, and Jaffer Zaidi returned to the show; while Ali Hamza (Noori), Sajjad Ali, Mekaal Hasan (Mekaal Hasan Band), Sahir Ali Bagga and Salman Ahmad made their Coke Studio debut as directors. Each director produced individual performances too; all under the supervision of Strings. There was at least one tribute song by each of them too.

Musicians

Production

Format
On 27 February 2017, Rafay Mahmood of The Express Tribune stated, "the biggest challenge for the show is to bridge the gap between the indie scene and the mainstream musicians". Earlier, it was also rumoured that the show was a ten-year deal to begin with, and after Strings' third, Rohail Hyatt will come back in season 10 to give a farewell. However, the multiple-producers format was a hit previous year and it made the show to be returned with the same format, despite Strings' claim that the show will follow the original format. The show had been promoted in media by the hashtag #CokeStudio10.

In launching ceremony on 11 August, Strings shared that the process of making songs has three stages: the first is when it is decided by December what song to feature; the second is when the artistes construct and reconstruct the songs in the jamming room; and the third is recording phase when they bring their own special vibe to the tracks. The performance version for release is recorded in one take, with 21 cameras shooting simultaneously.

Debutants
Humera Arshad made her Coke Studio debut with this season, she exclusively told DAWN Images, "There are no music releasing companies and under such circumstances I think Coke Studio is doing a great job". Sahir Ali Bagga also made his show debut as a featured artiste as well as a director, on which he said, "I always admired the platform, and it was a dream to be part of the team. I'm very excited to be part of Coke Studio, especially in the milestone season 10."

Like past seasons, this season too featured some new artistes; who made their debut through the show. Maliha Rehman of DAWN reported on 23 July 2017, "Salman Ahmad's son Sherjan Ahmad will play the acoustic guitar to his father's vocals, classical singer Javed Bashir's brother Akbar Ali will be in the limelight and house band member violinist Javed Iqbal is excited to share the stage with his son Ghulam Muhammad on the cello this year."

Co-producer Bilal Maqsood said, "All of these young musicians are actually very good at what they do." "It was just by chance that Season 10 will end up featuring so many of them", he continued revealing names of some young talent featuring in the show including Sanwal Khan Esakhelvi; Attaullah Khan Esakhelvi's son; who was approached to him by his father Anwar Maqsood. Young Esakhelvi said on his show debut, "Coke Studio is exciting for me because my father and I will be singing a mash-up together that has mostly been composed by him with some additions by me." Sajjad Ali, on career debut of his daughter Zaw Ali, said, "This is probably one of the rare times that a father and daughter will be singing together". Ali Zafar commented on the career debut of his youngest brother Danyal Zafar, "I feel that the struggle is very important and Danyal needs to experience it in order to move ahead." Danyal Zafar said, "I always dreamt of a debut that could best help me express myself as an artist in such a way that my music could also connect with people." Aima Baig said in launching ceremony on her show debut, "As a new artiste to have a platform where you can perform whatever you want is like dream comes true and I feel proud to get this opportunity."

Strings' farewell
On 29 October, the Strings announced the farewell from the show. They said that season 10 would be their last production, "It has been a fantastic journey for us over the course of 4 seasons and we are grateful to have had the opportunity to learn and share our work". They further said, "2018 will mark 30 years of Strings and we are super excited to celebrate with all of you".

Release

Each episode went on-air on Saturday in broadcast syndication, a day after each track was released online. Each episode was aired in one-hour timeslot, with each track preceded by its behind the scenes short clip. By the day, BTS too releases online. Only episode 7 was released and aired on Thursday, 21 September 2017, to respect the holy month of Muharram.

Promo song
The season was introduced by the collaborative rendition of "Qaumi Taranah" by the featured artistes. Released on 4 August, the anthem has been recomposed by Strings, "We hope to rekindle the spirit of patriotism and social consciousness in the heart of every Pakistani. This is more significant now than ever, as we are marking seventy years of our independence."

Episodes
The launching ceremony was held on Friday, 11 August 2017, where tracks from the first episode were screened after the "Qaumi Taranah".

Broadcast

Television
Following television channels air the episodes in Pakistan;

Radio
Following radio stations air the songs in Pakistan;

Reception

The show has been critically viewed for not producing new songs. Rafay Mahmood of The Express Tribune said that the lack of original music "has become a chronic problem with Coke Studio. With almost every passing season the title cover studio is becoming more relevant to the show than anything else."

After the season's artiste line up was revealed on 4 July, The News criticized the incomplete revealment while noting that Mooroo, Abid Brohi, SomeWhatSuper, Khumariyaan and Sounds of Kolachi should have been included in the show. Asif Nawaz of The Express Tribune commented, "While it's only time that will tell how the latest season unfolds, the urge to indulge in presenting our two cents about it seems too tempting to resist."

For the promo song; the recreated version of "Qaumi Taranah"; Umnia Shahid of The Express Tribune praised only Ali Zafar's performance and said, "The rest were simply wax figures executing a song – any song – any random song. Except, it wasn't just any random song." DAWN Images praised only Attaullah Khan Esakhelvi but said, "Overall, the song, the video, everything seems to be forgettable". This rendition seemed of "dull and lack emotions" to Asfia Fazal of Business Recorder. It felt "disjointed" to Maheen Sabeeh of The News, "not inspiring or motivating at all" to Shafiq Ul Hasan, and "no goose bumps" to Imane Babar Wahedi; latter both of The Express Tribune.

Extra notes

References

External links
 
 

Season10
2017 Pakistani television seasons